The Black Cherry Aphid, or cherry blackfly, (Myzus cerasi), is an aphid in the superfamily Aphidoidea in the order Hemiptera. It is a true bug and sucks sap from plants.

Host plants
It is known to live on both wild and domesticated cherry varieties.

Synonyms
 Aphis aparines Kaltenbach, 1843
 Aphis asperulae Walker, 1848
 Aphis cerasi Müller, 1776
 Aphis cerasi Fabricius, 1775
 Aphis euphrasiae Walker, 1849
 Aphis molluginis Koch, 1854
 Aphis veronicae Walker, 1848
 Myzoides cerasi van der Goot, 1913
 Myzoides cerasi Fabricius
 Myzus alectorolophi Heinze, 1961
 Myzus asperulae Walker, 1848
 Myzus callange Essig, 1954
 Myzus galiifolium Theobald, 1929
 Myzus langei Essig, 1936
 Myzus pruniavium Börner, 1926
 Myzus quasipyrinus Theobald, 1929

References

External links
 cabi.org
 agroatlas.ru
 influentialpoints.com
 plantwise.org

Agricultural pest insects
Macrosiphini